J. S. Fry & Sons, Ltd., better known as  Fry's, was a British chocolate company owned by Joseph Storrs Fry and his family. Beginning in Bristol in the 18th century, the business went through several changes of name and ownership, becoming J. S. Fry & Sons in 1822. In 1847, Fry's produced the first solid chocolate bar. The company also created the first filled chocolate sweet, Cream Sticks, in 1853. Fry is most famous for Fry's Chocolate Cream, the first mass-produced chocolate bar, which was launched in 1866, and Fry's Turkish Delight, launched in 1914.

Fry, alongside Cadbury and Rowntree's, was one of the big three British confectionery manufacturers throughout much of the nineteenth and twentieth centuries, and all three companies were founded by Quakers. The company became a division of Cadbury in the early twentieth century. The division's Somerdale Factory near Bristol was closed after the 2010 takeover of Cadbury's by Kraft Foods Inc.

History 

Joseph Fry, a Quaker, was born in 1728. He started making chocolate around 1759. In 1761, Fry and John Vaughan purchased a small shop from an apothecary, Walter Churchman, and with it the patent for a chocolate refining process. The company was then named "Fry, Vaughan & Co.". In 1777 their chocolate works moved from Newgate Street to Union Street, Bristol. Joseph Fry died in 1787 and the company was renamed "Anna Fry & Son". In 1795 Joseph Storrs Fry assumed control of the company. He patented a method of grinding cocoa beans using a Watt steam engine, and as a result, factory techniques were introduced into the cocoa business.

In 1803, Anna Fry died and Joseph Storrs Fry partnered with a Dr. Hunt. The business was renamed "Fry & Hunt". In 1822 Hunt retired and Joseph Storrs Fry took on his sons Joseph, Francis and Richard as partners: the firm was renamed "J. S. Fry & Sons". The company became the largest commercial producer of chocolate in the UK. In 1835, Joseph Storrs Fry died and his sons took full control.

In 1847, the Fry's chocolate factory on Union Street, Bristol, moulded a chocolate bar suitable for large-scale production. The firm began producing the Fry's Chocolate Cream bar in 1866. Over 220 products were introduced in the following decades, including the UK's first chocolate Easter egg in 1873 and Fry's Turkish Delight (or "Fry's Turkish bar") in 1914. In 1896 the firm became a registered private company, run by the Fry family, with Joseph Storrs Fry II, grandson of the first Joseph Storrs Fry, as the chairman.

In 1881, an employee of Fry's, H. J. Packer, established his own chocolate business in Bristol. At its eventual home in Greenbank, Bristol, Packer's Chocolate continued to provide local competition for Fry's until 2006, under various owners and brands, from Bonds through to Famous Names and Elizabeth Shaw.

Near the start of World War I the company was one of the largest employers in Bristol. Joseph Storrs Fry II died in 1913. In 1919 the company merged with Cadbury's chocolate and the joint company was named "British Cocoa and Chocolate Company".  Under Egbert Cadbury the Fry's division began from 1923 to move to Somerdale, Keynsham, just outside Bristol. After 1981 the name Fry's was no longer in use at Somerdale, but the factory was still a major producer of Cadbury's products.

In October 2007, Cadbury announced plans to close the Somerdale plant, the historic home of the Fry's Factory, by 2010 with the loss of some 500 jobs. In an effort to maintain competitiveness in a global marketplace, production was to be moved to a new factory in Poland. Another motivational factor was the high value of the land. Labour MP for Wansdyke, Dan Norris, said, "News of the factory's closure is a hard and heavy blow, not just to the workforce, but to the Keynsham community as a whole".

In February 2010, following the takeover of Cadbury plc by Kraft Foods, the closure was controversially confirmed to take place in 2011; Kraft had specifically agreed during the takeover battle to keep the site open. There was widespread outrage in the press and later a House of Commons Select Committee investigation into the affair.

Archives 
Records relating to both the business and the family are held at Bristol Archives (Ref. 38538). Some records concerning the role of J. S. Fry & Sons within Cadbury are held with the Mondelez International repository at Cadbury's UK headquarters in Bournville.

In popular culture 

On the BBC television programme Being Human, an old Fry's Cocoa billboard hangs prominently on the side of the B&B where the main characters reside in Series 3–5. The billboard is a nod to the show's original Bristol location.

In April 2020 an original enamel advertising sign with the distinctive "five boys" trademark design was featured on BBC's Antiques Roadshow and was valued at £1,000-£1,500. The boy featured in the design, Lindsay Poulton, had been photographed in 1886 by his father who, for the first image, soaked a cloth in ammonia and wrapped it round the boy's neck to make him cry. Poulton, in his eighties, related this story to Fry's employees when he was given a tour of the Bristol factory.

The distinctive "five boys" design expressing "Desperation, Pacification, Expectation, Acclamation and Realization "It's Fry's". The reference to Queen Alexandra indicates a date before her death in 1925.

See also

 Fry's Chocolate Cream
 Fry's Turkish Delight
 Crunchie
 Creme Egg
 List of bean-to-bar chocolate manufacturers

References

External links

J.S. Fry and Sons
British chocolate companies
Defunct food manufacturers of the United Kingdom
Manufacturing companies based in Bristol
Victorian era
1761 establishments in England
2010 disestablishments in England
Defunct companies based in Bristol
History of Bristol
Keynsham
British companies established in 1761
British companies disestablished in 2010
Food and drink companies established in 1761
Food and drink companies disestablished in 2010